Eslamabad-e Pain may refer to:
 Eslamabad-e Pain, Golestan
 Eslamabad-e Pain, Sistan and Baluchestan